From the Bottom Up is an American reality television docuseries series that aired for three seasons on BET. The series follows five women who were very successful until unforeseen circumstances derailed their careers. The show follows the women as they claw their way back to the top and redeem themselves. It premiered on January 16, 2016 and ended on April 21, 2018, with a total of 22 episodes over the course of 3 seasons.

Production
On September 30, 2016, BET Her announced that From the Bottom Up had been renewed for a second season with Maia Campbell joining the cast. The second season premiered on October 29, 2016

On February 3, 2018, BET announced the renewal for the third season which aired on March 3, 2018, with Angela Stanton-King joining the cast.

Cast

Episodes

References

External links
 

2010s American reality television series
2016 American television series debuts
2018 American television series endings
BET original programming